Trafford Quays is a proposed tram stop for Greater Manchester's Metrolink light rail system, that would be created to serve passengers boarding and alighting at the Trafford Waters development area.

The line has so far been constructed as far as  but this stop is not yet a committed scheme.

External links
 Metrolink future network (archived version)

Proposed Manchester Metrolink tram stops